Pahlavuni (classical orthography: Պահլաւունի) was an Armenian noble family, a branch of the Kamsarakan, that rose to prominence in the late 10th century during the last years of the Bagratuni monarchy.

Origins
The Pahlavunis (also spelled Pahlavounis) were an offshoot of the Kamsarakan noble house, which had ceased to exist as a result of a failed uprising against the Arab rule in Armenia, in the late 8th century. In 774 the nature of the Arab rule had provoked the Armenian nakharars into a major rebellion which included the Kamsarakans. The defeat of the rebels at the Battle of Bagrevand in April 775 was followed by ruthless suppression of opposition in the years that followed. The power and influence of the Kamsarakans along with other leading nakharar houses such as the Mamikonians and the Gnunis was destroyed for good. Those that survived were either exiles in the Byzantine Empire or dependants of other houses, chiefly the Artsruni and the Bagratuni. They were forced to sell their hereditary principalities to the Bagratunis, such as the regions of Shirak and Arsharunik. The Bagratuni Prince Ashot the Carnivorous bought the former estates of the Kamsarakan family around Arpa River near Mren, 34 km south of Ani which was also a Bagratuni possession.

Branches
In the 11th century the Pahlavunis controlled and built various fortresses throughout Armenia such as Amberd and Bjni and played a significant role in all the affairs of the country. According to Cyril Toumanoff, following the abdication in 1045-46 of Prince Gregory II (who received from the court of Constantinople the rank of magistros and the office of duke of Mesopotamia, Vaspurakan, and Taron) in favor of the emperor, the Pahlavunis, under Oshin of Gandzak, moved to Cilician Armenia, forming the House of Hethumids. Toumanoff also names the Zakarid-Mxargrzeli house as branch of the Pahlavunis.

References

Sources  
 

Pahlavuni family